Barf Anbar (also Romanized as Barf Anbār) is a city in the Central District of Fereydunshahr County, Isfahan Province, Iran. At the 2006 census, its population was 5,056, in 1,257 families.

References

Populated places in Fereydunshahr County

Cities in Isfahan Province